Gutwein is a surname of German origin literally meaning "good wine". Notable people with the surname include:

 Douglas Gutwein, American politician
 Peter Gutwein (born 1964), Australian politician

References 

German-language surnames